The Battle of Panipat may refer to:

 First Battle of Panipat (1526) fought between the Timurids under Babur and Ibrahim Lodi.
 Second Battle of Panipat (1556), fought between Emperor Hemchandra Vikramaditya and the Mughals under Akbar.
 Third Battle of Panipat (1761), fought between the Maratha Empire and the Durrani Empire under the Afghan king Ahmad Shah Abdali.

References